Sachendra Gamaadikari (born 5 July 1997) is a Sri Lankan cricketer. He made his List A debut on 22 December 2019, for Police Sports Club in the 2019–20 Invitation Limited Over Tournament.

References

External links
 

1997 births
Living people
Sri Lankan cricketers
Sri Lanka Police Sports Club cricketers
Place of birth missing (living people)